The 2021-22 season is Chonburi's 16th season in the Thai League T1 since 2006. The season was supposed to start on 31 July 2021 and concluded on 21 May 2022.  Then, due to the situation of the COVID-19 pandemic is still severe, FA Thailand decided to postpone the season to start on 13 August 2021 instead. However, as it stands on 23 July 2021, the COVID-19's situation is getting even worse. Therefore, FA Thailand decided to postpone the opening day for the second time to start on 3 September 2021.

Players

Current squad
As of 4 January 2022

Transfer

Pre-season transfer

In

Loan In

Out

Loan Out

Mid-season transfer

In

Loan In

Out

Loan Out

Competitions

Overview

Thai League 1

League table

Results summary

Results by matchday

Matches

Thai FA Cup

Matches

Thai League Cup

Matches

Team statistics

Appearances and goals

Overall summary

Season summary

Score overview

Notes

References

External links
 Chonburi F.C. Official Website
 Thai League Official Website

Chonburi F.C. seasons
Association football in Thailand lists
CBR